Sarah Jill "Lalla" Ward (born 28 June 1951) is an English actress, voice artist and author. She is best known for playing the role of Romana II in the BBC television series Doctor Who from 1979 to 1981.

Career

Early career
Ward's stage name, "Lalla", originates from her attempts as a toddler to pronounce her own name.  She left school at age 14 because she "loathed every single minute of it", and took her O-levels on her own. Ward studied at the Central School of Speech and Drama from 1968 to 1971. After spending a few years painting, she auditioned at London drama schools "as a sort of dare" to herself: 

Ward began her acting career in the Hammer horror film Vampire Circus (1972), and played Lottie, the teenage daughter of Louisa Trotter (Gemma Jones) in The Duchess of Duke Street, the BBC drama series of the mid-1970s. She appeared in the films England Made Me (1973), Matushka (1973), Rosebud (1975), and Crossed Swords (or The Prince and the Pauper) (1977). In 1974, she acted in a film called Got It Made, directed by James Kenelm Clarke. Club International magazine ran a set of nude pictures, claiming they were of her but actually featuring images from the 1978 film Sweet Virgin, and Ward successfully sued the magazine. Her television work included The Upper Crusts (1973) as the daughter of Margaret Leighton and Charles Gray, Van der Valk (1973), The Protectors (1973), Quiller (1975), Who Pays the Ferryman? (1977), as Jill Haydon, daughter of the underworld crime boss William Henry (Bill) Hayden in an episode of the hard-hitting British police drama The Professionals, the episode entitled When the Heat Cools Off (1978) and Hazell (1979).  In 1980, she played Ophelia to Derek Jacobi's Hamlet in the BBC television production.

Doctor Who
She was the second actress to play the Time Lord Romana in Doctor Who. After a guest appearance as Princess Astra in the Doctor Who story The Armageddon Factor in 1979, Ward was chosen to replace Mary Tamm, who had decided against continuing in the role. She appeared in all of Season 17's stories and then her character was written out in the third to last story of Season 18 in the story entitled Warriors' Gate.

After Doctor Who, she appeared in the TV movie Schoolgirl Chums (1982), and The Jeweller's Shop and The Rehearsal on stage. Ward decided to end her acting career after marrying Richard Dawkins. However, she has since reprised the character of Romana in the 1993 charity special Dimensions in Time, the 2003 webcast version of Shada, and in several Doctor Who and Gallifrey audio plays produced by Big Finish Productions. She also played the 'Mistress' opposite John Leeson's 'K-9' in two audio plays from BBV. In addition, she has appeared at a number of Doctor Who conventions and related special events. In November 2013 she appeared in the one-off 50th anniversary comedy homage The Five(ish) Doctors Reboot.

Books
Ward has recorded audio books, including Steven Pinker's The Language Instinct and Shada by Gareth Roberts and Douglas Adams. She co-narrated The Selfish Gene, The Ancestor's Tale, The God Delusion, The Blind Watchmaker and The Greatest Show on Earth: The Evidence for Evolution with her then husband. In the 1980s. She also wrote two books on knitting and one on embroidery. Ward is a keen chef, and she contributed a recipe to The Doctor Who Cookbook which was edited by Gary Downie.

She also provided illustrations for Climbing Mount Improbable and Astrology for dogs (and owners) by William Fairchild (1980).

Textiles and ceramics
Ward is a textile artist and ceramicist. Her subjects are rare and endangered animals. She refers to her technique of creating fabric pictures as thread drawing, considering this a more accurate term for her work than the commonly used thread painting.

In 2009, at the suggestion of the Gerald Durrell Foundation, she prepared an exhibition of textiles and ceramics on the theme of Galapagos wildlife. The auction raised £24,000 for the Durrell Wildlife Conservation Trust's campaign for the Floreana mockingbird and other wildlife of Galapagos.

She has shown three exhibitions at the National Theatre, London. Her 2010 textiles exhibition, Stranded, was inspired by the evolution of animals on islands. In 2011, Migration featured works which combined textiles and ceramics, the subjects seeming to move across both media. The theme of Vanishing Act, 2013, was camouflage. As with previous shows, Ward made available detailed instructions explaining her techniques. She also used one glass case to recreate her workspace, including such sources of inspiration as music, quotes, and a photo of her dog.

Charity work
Ward has served for almost 20 years on the committee of the Actors' Charitable Trust (TACT) and 10 years as a trustee. Alongside Richard and Sheila Attenborough, she led a successful £7.5 million redevelopment of the actors' care home Denville Hall.

Personal life
Ward was in a relationship with her co-star Tom Baker whilst working on Doctor Who, and they lived together in a flat in Deptford. The couple married in December 1980 however, the marriage lasted only 16 months. Ward attributed the separation to work commitments, different lifestyles and conflicts of interest. Regarding her marriage to Baker, Ward is quoted as saying: 

Ward said in 2004 that her long friendship with Douglas Adams, with whom she worked on Doctor Who, meant more to her and was "more valuable and more enduring" than her marriage to Baker.

In 1992, at his 40th birthday party, Adams introduced her to his friend Richard Dawkins (biologist and author of books including The Selfish Gene, The Blind Watchmaker and The God Delusion). Ward and Dawkins married later that year. In 2016, in a joint statement, the couple announced their amicable separation after 24 years of marriage.

Family
Sarah Ward is the daughter of Edward Ward, 7th Viscount Bangor, and his fourth wife, Marjorie Alice Banks; as such, she is entitled to use the courtesy title "The Honourable". Her father was the BBC's war correspondent in Finland at the beginning of the Second World War, while her mother was a writer and BBC producer specialising in dramatised documentaries. Her mother, Lady Bangor, committed suicide in July 1991.

She has a brother, Edward, two years her junior; and a half-brother, William, who is The 8th Viscount Bangor, three years her senior. Through her father, she is descended from The 1st Duke of Clarence, brother of Edward IV and Richard III, and from The 1st Earl of Peterborough, from The 1st Viscount Mordaunt, and from The 1st Viscount Bangor.

Her great-grandmother Mary Ward was an Anglo-Irish illustrator and amateur scientist, documented as the first person in the world to die in a motor vehicle accident.

Filmography

Film

Television

See also
 Asteroid 8347 Lallaward – named after her

References

External links

 
 Photos of Ward and information on her knitting books

1951 births
20th-century English actresses
Alumni of the Royal Central School of Speech and Drama
Audiobook narrators
Daughters of viscounts
English people of Irish descent
English television actresses
Living people
English atheists